The Madrasa of Amir Sunqur Sa'di, also commonly known as the Mausoleum of (Sheikh) Hasan Sadaqa, is a medieval Mamluk-era madrasa structure and mausoleum in Cairo, Egypt. It was originally built between 1315 and 1321 CE by amir Sunqur Sa'di. Sunqur was forced to leave Egypt in his lifetime and was never buried there, but a sheikh known as Hasan Sadaqa was later buried in it and therefore the building is often known by his name. From the 17th century onward the complex was converted into Mevlevi Sufi lodge (a takkiya, or more specifically a mawlawiyya) and is open today as the Mawlawiyya Museum or Museo Mevlevi.

History

Foundation and construction in the Mamluk period 

Amir Sunqur Sa'di was the commander of the "royal mamluks" under Sultan al-Nasir Muhammad, and a secretary of the army (na'ib al-jaysh). Al-Nasir's reign marked the peak of Cairo's prosperity in the medieval era, and a significant amount of construction took place at this time. The area northwest of the Citadel, in particular, was a previously sparsely-occupied district which was developed into a royal quarter with many palaces and mosques constructed by, or for, his most important amirs (Mamluk commanders or state officials).

Between 1315 and 1321 CE (715-721 AH), Sunqur Sa'di built a madrasa (possibly intended as a khanqah), a convent (ribat) for women, and a mausoleum for himself. However, he later became involved in a quarrel with one of the most powerful amirs of his time, Amir Qawsun, whose monumental palace, built between 1330 and 1337, was located right next to the site of Sunqur's madrasa. Qawsun forced him to leave Egypt and flee to Tripoli (Lebanon) in 1323 and, as a result, he was never buried in his mausoleum. A contemporary sheikh by the name of Hasan Sadaqa was buried there instead. 

However, there is some uncertainty as to whether the mausoleum was intended to be dedicated to Hasan Sadaqa's tomb from the beginning. The cenotaph over Hasan Sadaqa's tomb cites Sunqur as the founder of the building, but states that the building is the shrine (darih) of Hasan Sadaqa himself. This would seem to suggest that Sunqur dedicated the building to Hasan Sadaqa, but this would be unusual in Mamluk architectural history and it seems unlikely that a high-ranking Mamluk amir would construct such an impressive mausoleum and religious complex with no intention to use it for himself. Elsewhere, Hasan Sadaqa is described in historical sources as a wealthy notable, possibly a merchant, who sponsored the building, while his own cenotaph describes him as a Sufi (Islamic mystic) sheikh. To add to the confusion, the cenotaph is dated to 1315, well before Sunqur fled Egypt (1323) and before the mausoleum's completion (1321), while other sources give his date of death as 1345, well after Sunqur had left. One possible interpretation is that Hasan Sadaqa was a Sufi sheikh with great wealth who co-sponsored the foundation and construction of Sunqur's building, and thus at some point was granted the privilege of sharing the mausoleum with Sunqur. If so, this arrangement would nonetheless be unusual in Mamluk architectural traditions, but the question remains unresolved.

Later history and use as a Mevlevi Sufi lodge

The Mevlevi Sufi order (the followers of Jalal al-Din Rumi, known in the Western world simply as "Rumi"), which originated in Turkey, likely arrived in Cairo thanks to Egypt's integration into the Ottoman Empire after 1517. In 1607 the grounds of the madrasa and part of the ruins of Qawsun's palace were given over to the Mevlevi Sufi order as a donation from a Yemeni Ottoman pasha called Yusuf Sinan. It was part of a larger donation which included three other plots of land in Cairo and in other locations in the Nile Delta region. The Mevlevis adapted the site for use as a lodge (a takkiya or mawlawiyya) for their order. The original donation by Yusuf Sinan is well-documented and even contained instructions for the establishment's staff and their salaries: these included an imam, a muezzin, and 38 people required for performing the [[Sama (Sufism)|sama (whirling dervish)]], along with maintenance staff. A theatre or ceremonial hall for the performance of the sama' was built in 1810 on top of the former courtyard of the original madrasa, with painted decoration dated to 1857. New tombs for the order's Sufi sheikhs were added in or near the original mausoleum over time.

The Mevlevis remained here until 1945, but the building is no longer used as a Sufi lodge today. Excavations and restorations on the site started in the 1970s, led by an Italian team. This led to the building being reopened in July 1988 as a small museum known as the Mawlawiyya (or Mevlevi) Museum, or Museo Mevlevi, exhibiting the historical remains and the restored Mevlevi lodge.

Description
The madrasa structure itself only partially remains today, as the Mevlevi order built their facilities on top of it. The mausoleum and the sama''' ceremonial hall are in better shape and have been restored in recent times.

The Mamluk-era structure

The building's entrance from the street is through a doorway under a canopy of stone-carved decorations, including . To the left is the mausoleum and the former madrasa, marked by a dome and minaret at the building's corner. The exterior surface of the mausoleum dome, as well as the exterior of the minaret, are covered in lavish carved stucco decoration that is considered uncommon in Mamluk architecture. The minaret's overall shape is typical of the Bahri Mamluk period, with a square shaft and a fluted cap with a keel-arch profile (similar to the minaret of the Mausoleum of Salar and Sanjar al-Jawli).

Inside, the madrasa's remains are located beneath the 19th-century Sufi lodge's theatre. The walls of the madrasa are made of ablaq (two-coloured) stone, around a central courtyard (sahn) around which were large iwans (vaulted chambers open on one side) and multiple smaller rooms. Only the northwest iwan remains today, adjacent to the mausoleum chamber. In the central courtyard are the remains of a fountain with a lobed profile, excavated during modern restorations, which dates back to the Tulunid period in the 9th century. In another corner, an even older well (dating from before 850 CE) was also discovered.

The mausoleum chamber is under the northwestern dome (visible from the street), at the structure's northern corner, and contains the cenotaph of Hasan Sadaqa. It is 7.8 by 8.4 meters, meaning it is not quite square, and the dome above is slightly elliptic as a consequence. The squinches (the transition zones between the round dome and the square chamber) are composed of pendentives with muqarnas forms, with colored glass windows in between. The chamber's decoration otherwise consists of carved stucco bands containing Arabic calligraphy inscriptions, on arabesque backgrounds, running along the walls. One extraordinary feature of this mausoleum is the fact that these lengthy inscriptions are not from the Qur'an or any other religious text. Instead, they are excerpts from the Maqamat al-Hariri, a collection of stories by the poet al-Hariri which describe the adventures of a vagabond and trickster, Abu Zayd, who travels and relies on his wits and eloquence to survive. Although the Maqamat al-Hariri is valued as a work of Arabic literature and appears to have been popular with the Egyptian Mamluks of Sunqur's era, the decision to include this type of text instead of Qur'anic verses or other religious selections is considered bold and unusual. It may be that Sunqur was a connoisseur of literature, or that he simply had eccentric tendencies, which manifested here. The only Qur'anic inscription in the mausoleum is a short circular inscription of the Throne Verse at the apex of the dome.

The rooms of the women's convent (ribat) which Sunqur Sa'di built are now offices for the Italian-Egyptian Center for Restoration and Archaeology, which restored the building and opened the museum. The grounds also include a garden which was part of Qawsun's palace next-door but integrated into the precinct by the Mevlevis.

The 19th-century Mevlevi Sufi lodge
The Sufi ritual hall/theatre, known as a sama'khana (Arabic, "House of Listening") or semahane (Turkish), is made largely of wood, in an architectural style reminiscent of late Ottoman Baroque. It is built above the former madrasa's courtyard. The hall is square (dimensions: 15 by 15 meters) but is centered around a wide circular floor (diameter: 10.65 meters), under another wide dome, where the [[Sama (Sufism)|whirling dervish dance (sama)]] was performed. The floor is surrounded on all sides by a two-storied gallery, though the old northwest iwan is still accessible on one side. The theatre's current structure was built in 1810 while the decoration dates from 1857. The decoration includes scenes of landscapes, gardens, and birds painted under the dome, plus a circular Arabic inscription at the dome's apex.

References

External links

 CFPR-CIERA – Centro di Formazione Professionale al Restauro – Centro Italo-Egiziano per il Restauro e l'Archeologia:'' Website of the institute responsible for the restoration of the monument and the creation of the Mevlevi Museum. Contains pictures, floor plans, and other information.

Mamluk architecture in Egypt
Museums in Cairo
Mevlevi Order
Mausoleums
Mosque buildings with domes
13th-century madrasas
Schools in Cairo
Ottoman architecture in Egypt
Madrasas in Egypt